Reao Airport  is an airport serving the village of Tapuarava, located on the Reao island, in the Tuamotu group of atolls in French Polynesia.

Reao island airport was inaugurated in 1979.

Airlines and destinations

Passenger
No scheduled flights as of May 2019.

Statistics

References

External links
 Atoll list (in French)
 Classification of the French Polynesian atolls by Salvat (1985)

Airports in French Polynesia
Atolls of the Tuamotus